Fauna of Norway may refer to:
 List of birds of Norway
 List of mammals of Norway

See also
 Outline of Norway